Baicalasellus is a genus of crustaceans in the family Asellidae. It contains the following species:

Baicalasellus angarensis (Dybowski, 1884)
Baicalasellus baicalensis (Grube, 1872)
Baicalasellus korotnevi (Semenkevich, 1924)
Baicalasellus minutus (Semenkevich, 1924)

References

Asellota
Isopod genera